Giovanni Bernardo Carlone (1590–1630) was an Italian painter of the late-Mannerist and early-Baroque periods.

He was born in Genoa. He was the son of Taddeo Carlone, a sculptor and historical painter, who placed him under the tuition of Pietro Sorri, and he afterwards frequented the school of Domenico Passignano at Florence. He returned to Genoa was much employed there and at Rome and Florence. He assisted his younger brother, Giovanni Battista Carlone in the immense fresco work in the Basilica della Santissima Annunziata del Vastato at Genoa, and was invited to Milan to paint the ceiling of the church of the Theatines, which he did not live to finish. It was  completed by his brother. He died at Milan.

Most of his works are in Genoa and in Liguria.

References

1590 births
1630 deaths
16th-century Italian painters
Italian male painters
17th-century Italian painters
Painters from Genoa
Italian Baroque painters